Leptidea morsei (Fenton's wood white) is a butterfly of the family Pieridae. It is found from central Europe to Siberia, Ussuri, Korea, northern China and Japan. The habitat consists of damp, grassy vegetation at the sunny edges of woods, in grassy woodland clearings and on regenerating woodland on grassland. They occur almost exclusively in oak forest and mixed deciduous woods.

The wingspan is 46–54 mm. Adults are on wing from April to May and again from June to July in two generations per year.

The larvae feed on legumes, including Lathyrus niger, Lathyrus hallersteinii and Lathyrus vernus in Europe. Other recorded food plants include Vicia cracca, Vicia japonica and Vicia amoena. Hibernation takes place in the pupal stage.

Subspecies
Leptidea morsei morsei
Leptidea morsei major Grund, 1905
Leptidea morsei morseides Verity, 1911

Gallery

References

Leptidea
Butterflies described in 1881
Butterflies of Europe
Butterflies of Asia